Operation Supercharge  may refer to:

 Operation Supercharge (1941), the second of three operations to relieve the Australian 9th Division during the siege of Tobruk
 Operation Supercharge (1942), an attack during the Second Battle of El Alamein that broke through Axis defensive lines
 Operation Supercharge II, an outflanking maneuver at the Tebaga Gap in the Tunisian Campaign